Hattie Stowe is a 1947 historical play by the British writer Ian Hay. It portrays the life of the nineteenth century American abolitionist Harriet Beecher Stowe. It was very different in tone from Hay's usual plays, generally light comedies with naval themes. It was first staged at the Embassy Theatre in the West End on 11 February 1947.

References

Bibliography
 Wearing, J.P. The London Stage 1940-1949: A Calendar of Productions, Performers, and Personnel.  Rowman & Littlefield, 2014.

1947 plays
Plays by Ian Hay
Cultural depictions of American women
Cultural depictions of writers
Plays set in the United States
West End plays
Plays set in the 19th century
Plays based on real people
Plays based on actual events